Allarete is a genus of midges in the family Cecidomyiidae. There are twelve described species in this genus. It is known from the holarctic, afrotropical, and oriental regions. The genus was first described by Arthur Earl Pritchard in 1951.

Species
Allarete africana Enderlein, 1911
Allarete bharatica Grover & Bakhshi, 1978
Allarete bhokarensis Deshpande, Shaikh & Sharma, 2002
Allarete bicornuta Jaschhof, 1997
Allarete deepica Deshpande, Shaikh & Sharma, 2002
Allarete hindica (Deshpande, Shaikh & Sharma, 2002)
Allarte indica (Grover, 1964)
Allarete nigra Mamaev, 1994
Allarete orientalis (Grover, 1964)
Allarete spatuliformis Grover, 1979
Allarete spinosa Deshpande, Shaikh & Sharma, 2002
Allarete vernalis (Felt, 1908)

References

Cecidomyiidae genera

Insects described in 1951
Taxa named by Arthur Earl Pritchard